Andy Maddocks (born 28 November 1967) is an English entrepreneur and musician who founded Skam Records, a Manchester-based independent electronic label, in 1990. He is also a member of the collaborative project Gescom with Darrell Fitton, Russell Haswell, and Rob Hall.

References

External links

Maddocks at Discogs
epm-musiconline
musicbrainz

Living people
British electronic musicians
British businesspeople
1967 births